Memel was a  cargo ship that was built in 1925 as Reval by Schiffs-und Dockbauwerft Flender AG, Lübeck, Germany for German owners. A sale in 1934 saw her renamed Memel. She was seized by the Allies in May 1945, passed to the Ministry of War Transport (MoWT) and was renamed Empire Constellation. In 1946, she was transferred to the Soviet Union and renamed Ivan Sechenov.

Description
The ship was built in 1925 by Schiffs-und Dockbauwerft Flender AG, Lübeck.

The ship had a GRT of 1,102 and a NRT of 575.

The engine was built by Waggon-und Maschinenbau AG, Görlitz.

History
Reval was built for Lübeck Linie AG, Lübeck. Her port of registry was Lübeck. The Code Letters PCDL were allocated. In 1929, her captain was Walter Heinrich Giermann, who had previously captained the four-masted schooner Vaterland. In 1934, Reval was sold to Mathies Reederei, Hamburg and was renamed Memel after the Baltic port ceded to Lithuania after World War I. Her port of registry was changed to Hamburg and the Code Letters DRBK were allocated.

In May 1945, Memel was seized by the Allies at Flensburg. She was passed to the MoWT and renamed Empire Constellation. Her port of registry was changed to London and she was placed under the management of J Hay & Sons Ltd. The Code Letters GKTC and United Kingdom Official Number 180774 were allocated. In 1946, Empire Constellation was transferred to the Soviet Union, and was renamed Ivan Gegenov.

On 14 January 1977, the ship, now renamed Ivan Sechenov, sank after colliding with the Liberian cargo ship  in foggy conditions in the Sea of Marmara, Turkey, with the loss of 22 crew.

Notes
 Mitchell & Sawyer give the name as Ivan Sechenov (Ива́н Се́ченов), but it was recorded as Ivan Gegenov in contemporary shipping registers. It is possible that she was later renamed Ivan Sechenov or that Ivan Gegenov is an error.

References

External links
Photo of Ivan Sechenov

1925 ships
Ships built in Lübeck
Steamships of Germany
Merchant ships of Germany
World War II merchant ships of Germany
Ministry of War Transport ships
Empire ships
Steamships of the United Kingdom
Merchant ships of the United Kingdom
Steamships of the Soviet Union
Merchant ships of the Soviet Union
Soviet Union–United Kingdom relations
Germany–Soviet Union relations
Maritime incidents in 1977